Gordon Joseph Bressack (May 28, 1951 – August 30, 2019) was an American television writer who won Emmy Awards for Pinky and the Brain and Animaniacs.

Television credits
Series head writer denoted in bold.
 The 13 Ghosts of Scooby-Doo (1985)
 Yogi's Treasure Hunt (1986)
 Pound Puppies (1986)
 Bionic Six (1987)
 The Adventures of Raggedy Ann and Andy (1988)
 DuckTales (1989)
 The Smurfs (1989)
 New Kids on the Block (1990)
 The Real Ghostbusters (1990)
 The Wizard of Oz (1990)
 Tiny Toon Adventures (1990)
 Teenage Mutant Ninja Turtles (1991)
 Yo Yogi! (1991)
 Darkwing Duck (1991)
 Adventures of Sonic the Hedgehog (1993)
 Mighty Max (1994): season 2 head writer
 Captain Simian & the Space Monkeys (1996)
 Animaniacs (1997)
 Pinky and the Brain (1998)
 Fat Dog Mendoza (1998)
 Pinky, Elmyra & the Brain (1999)
 The Adventures of Jimmy Neutron, Boy Genius (2002)
 Loonatics Unleashed (2006)
 Sushi Pack (2007)
 WordGirl (2014)
 The Octonauts (2017)

References

1951 births
2019 deaths
American television writers
Emmy Award winners